Gottfried Gabriel Bredow (14 December 17735 September 1814) was a German historian.

He was born at Berlin, and became successively professor at the universities of Helmstedt (1804), Frankfurt an der Oder and Breslau. He died at Breslau.

Bredow's principal works are Handbuch der alten Geschichte, Geographie und Chronologie (Eutin, 1799; English trans., London, 1827); Chronik des 17. Jahrhunderts (Altona, 1801); Entwurf der Weltkunde der Alten (Altona, 1816); Weltgeschichte in Tabellen (Altona, 1801; English trans. by J. Bell, London, 1820).

One known student was Johann Gottlieb Kunisch (1789–1852), teacher and author.

References

1773 births
1814 deaths
19th-century German historians
Writers from Berlin
People from the Margraviate of Brandenburg
Academic staff of the University of Helmstedt
Academic staff of European University Viadrina
Academic staff of the University of Breslau
German male non-fiction writers